The 1992 Nigerian Senate election in Edo State was held on July 4, 1992, to elect members of the Nigerian Senate to represent Edo State. John Oriaifo representing Edo South-East, Sunday Osarumwense Iyahen representing Edo South-West and Albert Legogie representing Edo North all won on the platform of the Social Democratic Party.

Overview

Summary

Results

Edo South-East 
The election was won by John Oriaifo of the Social Democratic Party.

Edo South-West 
The election was won by Sunday Osarumwense Iyahen of the Social Democratic Party.

Edo North 
The election was won by Albert Legogie of the Social Democratic Party.

References 

Edo
Edo State Senate elections
July 1992 events in Nigeria